Biškupić or Biskupic is a Croatian surname. Notable people with the surname include:

Božo Biškupić (born 1938), Croatian politician and lawyer
Joan Biskupic (born c. 1956), American journalist, author, and lawyer
Steven M. Biskupic (born 1961), U.S. Attorney for the Eastern District of Wisconsin

See also
 Biskupice (disambiguation)

Croatian surnames